Deshabandu Wegapitiya Kattadiyalage Hemachandra Wegapitiya, known professionally as W.K.H. Wegapitiya, is a Sri Lankan entrepreneur. He is one of the founders and the current chairman of LAUGFS Holdings Limited.

See also
 LAUGFS Holdings
 Sri Lanka Telecom

References

Deshabandu
Living people
Sinhalese businesspeople
Year of birth missing (living people)